Cyrtochloa puser is a species of flowering plant in the family Poaceae, native to Luzon in the Philippines. A climbing bamboo, it is used for basket weaving and related crafts.

References

Bambusoideae
Flora of Luzon
Plants described in 1998